René II, Viscount of Rohan (1550–1586), was Prince of Leon, Count of Porhoët and a Huguenot nobleman. He was the son of René I of Rohan-Gié and Isabella d'Albret (daughter of John III of Navarre and Catherine of Navarre, Queen regnant of Navarre).

René II married mathematician Catherine de Parthenay and had:
 Henri II, Duke of Rohan, a renowned soldier and author;
 Catherine de Rohan, married John II, Count Palatine of Zweibrücken.
 Benjamin, Duke of Soubise
 Anne de Rohan (1584–1646), poetess

References

Sources

Rene 02 de Rohan
Rene 02 de Rohan
1550 births
1586 deaths
All articles with unsourced statements
Huguenots